Edward Charles Kennedy Stewart (born November 8, 1966) is a Canadian politician and academic who served as the 40th mayor of Vancouver from 2018 to 2022. He previously was the member of Parliament (MP) for the riding of Burnaby—Douglas (2011–2015) and Burnaby South (2015–2018), serving in the House of Commons as a member of the New Democratic Party (NDP) caucus.

In May 2018, Stewart announced his pending resignation from Parliament, in order to seek election as mayor of Vancouver as an independent candidate. In August 2018, he publicly released his letter to the Speaker of House, Geoff Regan, confirming his resignation, effective September 14, 2018. During the 2018 Vancouver municipal election, Stewart was declared the winner of the mayoral race by a margin of fewer than 1,000 votes over Ken Sim, the Non-Partisan Association (NPA) candidate. In his bid for re-election in 2022, Stewart was defeated by Sim by more than 35,000 votes. Stewart is the first incumbent mayor to be defeated since 1980, when mayor Jack Volrich was upset by challenger Mike Harcourt.

Early life and career
Stewart was born in Halifax, Nova Scotia, in 1966 and raised in Wolfville, Nova Scotia. He earned his bachelor's degree in history from Acadia University.

After moving to Burnaby, British Columbia, in 1988, Stewart played bass guitar for the pop music band State of Mind. In 1991, his band won three West Coast Music Awards.

In 1995, Stewart received his master's degree in political science from Simon Fraser University, and a PhD in government from the London School of Economics in 2003.

As an academic, Stewart has published research on citizen participation, democratic reform, and municipal governance. His books include Local Government in Canada and Decrim: How We Decriminalized Drugs in British Columbia.

While serving as mayor, Stewart was on leave from teaching at Simon Fraser University's School of Public Policy. In January 2023, Stewart returned to SFU as director of the Centre for Public Policy Research. Stewart's wife, Jeanette Ashe, also teaches politics, at Douglas College.

Federal politics

On March 28, 2004, Stewart won the nomination for the New Democratic Party for the federal riding of Vancouver Centre in a close three-way race. Although he lost in the 2004 general election by 4,230 votes, he increased the NDP's vote share in Vancouver Centre by 20 percentage points compared to the 2000 election.

On February 25, 2011, Stewart secured the NDP nomination for the federal riding of Burnaby—Douglas in a first ballot victory. He won the riding in the 2011 general election with 44 percent of the vote, and was re-elected with 35 percent of the vote in 2015.

41st Parliament

In 2012, NDP Leader Thomas Mulcair appointed Stewart as official opposition critic for science and technology and as a member of the standing committee on industry, science and technology. In Parliament, he opposed the Conservative government's elimination of the long-form census and funding cuts for basic scientific research. He tabled legislation (Motion 453) to protect scientific integrity in government departments and end the muzzling of federal scientists.

In 2013, Stewart introduced Bill C-558, The Parliamentary Science Officer Act. Following the elimination of Canada's National Science Advisor in 2008, the bill aimed to create an independent science watchdog tasked with providing Parliament with sound scientific information and ensuring decisions are informed by the best available evidence. Bill C-558 was endorsed by Evidence for Democracy, the Canadian Association of University Teachers, the Professional Institute of the Public Service of Canada, and the Centre for Science in the Public Interest.

Stewart put forward a proposal (Motion 428) for the House of Commons to begin accepting petitions electronically as a means to engage more Canadians in the democratic process. It further proposed that short debates be triggered in Parliament if an online petition receives a significant number of signatures and is sponsored by at least five MPs. Stewart's proposal was endorsed by Ed Broadbent, Preston Manning, and a number of civil society groups. Being opposed by Prime Minister Stephen Harper and his Conservative cabinet, Motion 428 passed the House of Commons by only two votes (142-140) on January 29, 2014. It was widely viewed as a "surprise win" for the official opposition.

Stewart held public consultations with Burnaby residents on Kinder Morgan's proposal to build a new export-only, bitumen-based crude oil pipeline through his riding. Stewart became a vocal opponent of the project, citing community concerns over property expropriation, decreasing housing values, increased tanker traffic in the Burrard Inlet, the use of temporary foreign workers, and the lack of benefits for British Columbia. His constituency office helped local residents sign-up to participate in the National Energy Board's review of the project. In 2013, the Burnaby Newsleader named Stewart their "Newsmaker of the Year" for his community work on the Kinder Morgan pipeline.

Stewart is an advocate for social housing and federal action to address BC's housing crisis. In 2014, he put forward a BC-specific affordable housing strategy (Motion 547) to recognize housing as a fundamental right, expand public investments in housing co-ops, maintain rent subsidies for low-income families, set targets for reducing and ending homelessness, and study the impact of investor speculation and housing vacancies on real estate prices. His motion was endorsed by the City of Burnaby.

42nd Parliament
He was re-elected in the new riding of Burnaby South in the 2015 election.

Following the election, Stewart was re-appointed by Tom Mulcair as NDP critic for science.

On December 4, 2015, Parliament launched its new website for accepting electronic petitions from Canadians. Under the new system, initiated by Stewart's motion that passed before the election, the federal government has to respond within 45 days to online petitions if they are sponsored by one member of Parliament and receive at least 500 signatures. Stewart sponsored the first official e-petition in Canada on behalf of two local constituents.

On December 9, 2015, Stewart was elected by his caucus colleagues as chair of the NDP's British Columbia caucus. In a statement, he vowed to support the NDP's newly elected MPs getting established in Parliament, strengthen engagement with stakeholders and constituents across the province, and hold the new Liberal government accountable for its election promises on affordable housing and pipeline reviews.

2018 contempt of court

On March 23, 2018, Stewart was arrested for civil contempt during a demonstration against the Kinder Morgan pipeline. Other members of the demonstration, including fellow member of Parliament Elizabeth May, were also arrested concerning the same incident. They were accused of violating a court order requiring those demonstrating to stay five metres back from company work sites, when they allegedly blocked the roadway. On April 9, 2018, Justice Kenneth Affleck of the British Columbia Supreme Court recommended that Stewart and the others arrested should be charged with criminal contempt in relation to the alleged incident. On April 16, 2018, it was reported that special prosecutors would be overseeing the charges against Stewart and May. On May 14, 2018, Stewart pleaded guilty to criminal contempt of court for his actions during the protest and was fined $500. As criminal contempt is a common law—not a Criminal Code—offence, Stewart does not have a criminal record.

Vancouver municipal politics 
Stewart announced on May 10, 2018, that he would be resigning from Parliament in order to run to be the mayor of Vancouver in the 2018 Vancouver municipal election. His resignation was effective September 14, 2018 (the last day he can file his paperwork to officially enter the mayoral race). Until his resignation became official on September 14, Stewart told CBC News he intended to continue to campaign for mayor and collect his MP salary, saying that there was "overlap" between both roles. On May 24, 2018, Stewart announced, if elected mayor, he would create a lobbyist registry and new conflict-of-interest rules for City Hall.

Stewart won the mayoral election, with a margin of fewer than 1000 votes separating him from NPA candidate Ken Sim. Stewart is the first mayor of Vancouver to be unaffiliated with a municipal political party in over 30 years.

Mayoral term

Housing 
During the 2018 campaign, Stewart promised to address the housing crisis by approving the construction of more rental homes, co-ops, and market housing aimed at middle-income workers and families. He also promised to renew city-held leases to protect the city's current 6000 cooperative housing units. Since becoming mayor, Stewart has supported the Moderate Income Rental Housing Pilot Project (MIRHPP), which allows developers of secured market rental housing to add more units to their developments than the current zoning would allow as long as 20 percent of the units are permanently reserved for moderate income households.

In August 2019, the federal Minister of Families, Children and Social Development, Jean-Yves Duclos, and Stewart announced a partnership where the federal government would provide $184million in low-interest loans and grants to fund the construction of 1,100 units of affordable housing on City-owned land.

In November 2019, Stewartalong with Vancouver City Councilvoted to increase the Empty Homes Tax rate from 1% to 1.25% for the 2020 fiscal year and approved future increases in 0.25% increments in 2021 and 2022.

Opioid crisis 
As promised during the 2018 campaign, Stewart created a Mayor’s Overdose Emergency Task Force to address the opioid crisis in Vancouver. The task force produced 31 recommendations, which were unanimously approved by Council for implementation in December 2018. An additional eight recommendations were unanimously approved in July 2019, as well as a Safe Supply Statement advocating for a regulated, safe supply of drugs to prevent deaths from drug poisoning.

Transportation 
During the 2018 campaign, Stewart expressed his support for extending the planned Broadway extension of the SkyTrain's Millennium Line to Arbutus all the way to the University of British Columbia (UBC). He said that 2020 is a "critical year" to secure federal and provincial funding for the project and, on January 29, 2020, signed a memorandum of understanding with the Musqueam Indian Band, the Squamish Nation, the Tsleil-Waututh Nation and UBC, agreeing to work with the other signatories to seek funding to build SkyTrain to UBC.

Re-election attempt 
In November 2019, Stewart announced that he plans to run for re-election in the 2022 municipal elections. He ran under the Forward Together party. He was defeated by Ken Sim of ABC Vancouver in the election by a margin of 35,000 votes.

Electoral record

References

External links

Kennedy Stewart - NDP Website
Kennedy Stewart - Mayoral Campaign Website

1966 births
Alumni of the London School of Economics
Living people
Members of the House of Commons of Canada from British Columbia
New Democratic Party MPs
People from Halifax, Nova Scotia
Simon Fraser University alumni
People from Burnaby
Academic staff of Simon Fraser University
Acadia University alumni
21st-century Canadian politicians
Mayors of Vancouver